Lukovo is a village on the eastern slopes of Mount Kopaonik, in the municipality of Kuršumlija, in southern Serbia. It is a spa town (Lukovska Banja) of highest altitude in Serbia. According to the 2011 census, the village has a population of 275 inhabitants.

Lukovo Spa
Lukovo Spa (Lukovska Banja) is situated 681m above sea level, has 37 mineral water springs with temperatures ranging from 35–69,5 °C, warm also during the winters. The water is of hydro carbonate sodium-magnesium-calcium type, making it a good treatment by bathing as a part of medical rehabilitation, for diseases of locomotive apparatus, gynecology diseases and skin diseases. The sub-alpine region has temperate-continental climate, winters are temperately cold, summer temperately warm, autumns are warmer, clearer and drier than spring, the surrounding mountains makes the summer heats bearable with cold winds.

Sport
In January 2012, tennis coach Jelena Genčić announced the opening of the tennis center in the spa Lukovo.

Churches in vicinity
 Church of St. Mina, better known as the Štava Church, in Štava
 Church of St. George, also known as the Lukovo Church, located on Nenad's Stone
 Monastery of St. Gabriel:
 Church of Sts. Peter and Paul, better known as the Cave Church, has a unique icon of a bald Jesus.

See also
 List of spa towns in Serbia

References

External links
 Lukovska banja

Populated places in Toplica District
Spa towns in Serbia
Kuršumlija